The 2004 UCI Road World Cup was the sixteenth and last edition of the UCI Road World Cup. There was no change in the calendar from the 2003 edition, meaning the final seven editions had the same calendar.

Davide Rebellin of Gerolsteiner took a commanding lead in the standings following an excellent Ardennes campaign, winning both the Amstel Gold Race and the Monument Liège–Bastogne–Liège. Paolo Bettini's consistency through the season, however, saw the rider from Quick-Step–Davitamon overhaul Rebellin to claim his third consecutive World Cup crown and the outright record for competition victories. Bettini's excellent form in August had much input into the final standings: three second places in the three races gave Bettini 210 points compared to the 112 points Rebellin accumulated in this time placing Bettini just 6 points behind in second place. On the August weekend without a World Cup race, Bettini won the gold medal in the Olympic Games road race.

In the team competition, T-Mobile Team edged out Rabobank by a single point after Rabobank had led going into the final round.

The season opener at Milan–San Remo is particularly well remembered. In a sprint finish on the Via Roma, Erik Zabel thought he had done enough to secure victory and raised his arms in celebration. As he did, Óscar Freire was able to overtake him at the line and claim an improbable victory.

Races

Final standings

Riders

Teams

References

 
UCI Road World Cup
UCI Road World Cup (men)